Fessenheim-le-Bas is a commune in the Bas-Rhin department in Grand Est in north-eastern France.

It has been built near an old Roman road leading from Strasbourg to Saverne.

Notable people
 Aloyse Kobès (born at Fessenheim on April 14, 1820: died at Dakar on October 11, 1872) was the first missionary bishop from Alsace. Since 1972 a French school at Dakar has borne his name.

Transport link
The town is served by Bus Route 205 of the Compagnie des Transports Strasbourgeois (CTS) inter-urban service.

See also
 Fessenheim
 Communes of the Bas-Rhin department
 Kochersberg

References

Communes of Bas-Rhin
Bas-Rhin communes articles needing translation from French Wikipedia